Tape Deck Heart is the fifth studio album by English singer-songwriter Frank Turner, released on 22 April 2013 on Xtra Mile in the UK, and on Polydor / Interscope worldwide. Produced by Rich Costey, the album was preceded by the single, "Recovery."

Described as a "break-up album," Tape Deck Heart was written and recorded following the collapse of a long-term romantic relationship. Turner stated: "There’s a lot of stuff on this record about loss and failure in relationships, about what happens when something that was supposed to be timeless runs out of time."

Tape Deck Heart has been given a Parental Advisory label due to the profanity heard on tracks "Plain Sailing Weather" and "Good & Gone". The title of the album is taken from a lyric in the song "Tell Tale Signs".

Background and recording
After extensive touring in support of Turner's fourth studio album, England Keep My Bones (2011) - which included an appearance during the 2012 Summer Olympics opening ceremony and a headline show at Wembley Arena - Turner and his backing band, The Sleeping Souls, flew to Los Angeles, in October 2012, to enter the studio with producer Rich Costey, seeking a "big, warm expansive rock sound." Regarding the band's experience in Los Angeles, Turner stated, "It’s such a cliché – bands reach a certain level of success, go to L.A. to record an album. I was nervous about recording outside the UK because my music sounds English and I like that, but in fact, it didn’t make any difference. We stayed at the Holiday Inn next door and didn’t finish until dark every day, so I scarcely saw the sun shine."

Regarding Costey's production, Turner noted, "I will say that I think the production is a massive step up for me. [...] The man is a fucking genius." Nicknamed, "Sauron, the all seeing eye," by Turner and his bandmates, Costey often made the band perform multiple takes in the studio, with Turner stating: "He brings an almost autistic eye for detail. He made me do 42 vocal takes at one point, with the encouragement ‘I know there’s something in there'."

Fergus Coulbeck who featured on Turners 3rd album Poetry of the Deed was quoted saying he would never work with Turner again following a dispute over baked goods and refreshments available while recording Tape Deck Heart.

Writing and composition
Explaining the album's title, Turner stated, "A 'Tape Deck Heart' is someone who has a love of music above anything else. I don’t miss cassettes, but I am of an age - like many of us - whose music listening life was defined by Walkmen and C90 tapes."

Comparing the album's lyrical and thematic content to his previous album, England Keep My Bones (2011), Turner noted: "This record isn't about England at all — I did that last time round. This album is about self-examination, running through your own faults, about change, and about ending. Something like that."

Regarding the track, "Four Simple Words", Turner stated, "I think that song is something of a nod towards Queen, stylistically. But it’s not something that markedly runs through the record as such, I don’t think." Turner elaborated, "I tell people it's about dancing but it's really a song about punk rock and the pleasantly surprising revelation that, at 31, my ethics and approach to music are the same as when I was 15."

Artwork
The artwork for the album was done by SWFL tattoo artist Heather Ann Law.

Release
On 25 December 2012, Turner released a free download of "Four Simple Words" on his website, backed with a demo version of the song, "Cowboy Chords". The opening track and first single, "Recovery", premiered on Radio 1, on 4 March 2013 and was released on iTunes the following day.

The deluxe edition of the album contains six additional tracks, with Turner noting, "Track listing an album is a fine art, and usually a pretty agonising process. I’m glad I've had the opportunity to do the extended version for this one – all these songs belong together. That said, I think an album is a piece of art in its own right and can be too long, so it’s worth making the twelve-track definitive version. Choosing what makes it and what doesn’t is agonising, though."

Commercial performance
It became his most successful album yet, with 200,000 copies sold.

In the United States, the album debuted at No. 52 on Billboard 200, and No. 15 on Top Rock Albums, selling 7,000 copies in its first week. It has sold 44,000 copies in the United States as of July 2015.

Track listing

Editions

 Standard CD
 Deluxe CD
 12" Vinyl available in green or black
 iTunes LP
 Cassette Tape

Singles
"Four Simple Words" was released as a free download, along with a demo version of "Cowboy Chords" through Xtra Miles website on Christmas Day 2012. The first single from the album was "Recovery", which was released on 5 March 2013 and the music video was released the same day. "The Way I Tend To Be" was later released on 17 June and peaked at number 33 in the UK singles chart. "Losing Days" was the third single to be released.

Charts

Weekly charts

Year-end charts

Personnel

Frank Turner & the Sleeping Souls
Frank Turner – lead vocals, acoustic guitar, electric guitar, backing vocals
Ben Lloyd – electric guitar, backing vocals, noise (12), drums (12)
Tarrant Anderson – bass guitar, backing vocals, drums (12)
Matt Nasir – piano, accordion, organ, Mellotron, Rhodes, Wurlitzer, mandolin, xylophone, backing vocals, drums (12)
Nigel Powell – drums, percussion, recorder, backing vocals

Additional musicians
Rich Costey - electric guitar (1 and 9), backing vocals (7)
Elle King - banjo (3)
Fergus Coulbeck - jew’s harp ("her velvet tones")  
John Hill - soundscapes (3)
Chris Trovero - backing vocals (7)
Scott Keys - backing vocals (7)
Deena Keys - backing vocals (7)
Samantha Keys - backing vocals (7)
Chris Kasych - backing vocals (7)
Ben Hallett - backing vocals (7)

Recording personnel
Rich Costey - producer, recording, mixing
Chris Kasych - engineer, additional mixing (9 and 12)
Dave Schiffman - additional engineering
Eric Isip - recording assistant
Howie Weinberg - mastering
Nick Moorbath - producer, mixing (15 and 18)

Artwork
Heather Ann Law - cover design
Matt Hunt - portraits
Ben Morse - band photographs
Thomas Lacey - album artwork and layout

References

2013 albums
Frank Turner albums
Epitaph Records albums
Xtra Mile Recordings albums
Albums produced by Rich Costey